The 2004 United States House of Representatives elections in Oregon were held on November 2, 2004 to select Oregon's representatives to the United States House of Representatives. All five seats were up for election in 2004, as they are every two years. All five incumbents were re-elected, four of them by large margins; only the 5th district was somewhat competitive.

Overview

District 1

Democratic primary

Candidates

Results

Republican primary

Candidates

Results

General election

Candidates

Results

District 2

Democratic primary

Candidates

Results

Republican primary

Candidates

Results

General election

Candidates

Results

District 3

Democratic primary

Candidates

Results

Republican primary

Candidates

Results

General election

Candidates

Results

District 4

Democratic primary

Candidates

Results

Republican primary

Candidates

Results

General election

Candidates

Results

District 5

Democratic primary

Candidates

Results

Republican primary

Candidates

Results

General election

Candidates

Results

See also
 United States House of Representatives elections, 2004
 United States presidential election in Oregon, 2004
 United States Senate election in Oregon, 2004
 Oregon state elections, 2004

References

2004
Oregon
House